Schilpario (or ) is a comune (municipality) in the Province of Bergamo in the Italian region of Lombardy, located about  northeast of Milan and about  northeast of Bergamo.  

Schilpario borders the following municipalities: Azzone, Borno, Cerveno, Lozio, Ossimo, Paisco Loveno, Teglio, Vilminore di Scalve.

Schilpario is a mountain tourist destination during summer and during winter. Schilpario hosts alpine ski and cross-country ski facilities.

References

External links
 Official website